OpenOMR is an open source optical music recognition (OMR) tool written in Java for printed music scores.  It allows a user to scan printed sheet music and play it through the computer speakers. It is being published as free software under the terms of the GNU General Public License (GPL).

External links 
 

Music OCR software
Cross-platform free software
Free software programmed in Java (programming language)
Free music software